Gerald Harry Beloe (21 November 1877 – 1 October 1944) was an English cricketer.  Beloe was a left-handed batsman who bowled slow left-arm orthodox.  He was born at Westbury-on-Trym, Bristol, and was educated at Marlborough College.

Beloe made his first-class debut for Gloucestershire against Middlesex in 1898 County Championship.  He made five further first-class appearances for the county, all of which came in the 1899 County Championship, with his last match coming against Middlesex at Lord's.  In his six first-class matches for Gloucestershire, he scored a total of 153 runs at an average of 17.00, with a high score of 52 not out.  This score was the only time he passed fifty and came against Kent.

He died at Brandon Hill, Bristol, on 1 October 1944.

References

External links
Gerald Beloe at ESPNcricinfo
Gerald Beloe at CricketArchive

1877 births
1944 deaths
Cricketers from Bristol
People educated at Marlborough College
English cricketers
Gloucestershire cricketers
People from Westbury-on-Trym